Cheonbuk-myeon in South Korea may refer to:

Cheonbuk-myeon, Gyeongju in Gyeongsangbuk-do
Cheonbuk-myeon, Boryeong in Chungcheongnam-do